The Yackey Monoplane was an American three seat parasol monoplane flown in the late 1920s. Two prototypes had some success in the 1927 New York - Spokane National Air Derby and orders were placed but a crash killed its designer and ended production.

Design and development
The Yackey monoplane had a parasol wing built around two spruce box spars with plywood skinning ahead of the forward spar. It used the popular Clark Y airfoil and had a constant chord with blunt tips. It was braced to the fuselage on pairs of parallel struts to the lower fuselage longerons, and a central, short inverted vee cabane to the top of the fuselage.

It was powered by a  Wright Whirlwind J-5 9-cylinder radial mounted in the nose with its cylinders exposed for cooling. The fuselage was flat-sided apart from raised upper decking. Both the cockpits were open, with the two passengers placed side-by-side over the wing with entry via full-depth doors. The pilot sat just aft of the wing trailing edge, where a cut-out provided a wider upper field of view. Baggage or mail was placed in a large hold behind the pilot. Its fuselage tapered rearwards to a cropped-triangular fin with a comma profile, balanced rudder. The tailplane was semi-elliptical in plan and mounted on top of the fuselage, each side braced from below with a strut and a parallel wire and from above with a wire to the fin. Elevators were full and rounded, with a large gap between them for rudder movement.

The Yaxley had fixed, conventional landing gear with large wheels, each fitted with brakes and on half-axles mounted on the lower fuselage longerons. Short, vertical legs were mounted on the forward wing struts which were reinforced at those points by diagonal struts to the wing centre-section. Drag struts sloped upwards to the root of the rear wing strut. Its spring-steel tailskid was steerable.

Operational history
The two prototypes took part in the 1927 National Air Derby, a 24 hour race between New York and Spokane. One, piloted by Hamilton Lee, gained fifth place and a $500 prize.

By October 1927 Yackey had rebuilt and reorganized his two factories for serial production at an initial rate of one in three weeks, moving to one a week at the start of 1928. They had firm orders for five. However, these plans were abandoned after 4 October when Yackey died making a final test flight of a Monoplane before handing it over to its new owner. A newly reinforced wing bracing failed during the programme of aerobatics he routinely used in a final, personal test of all his aircraft.

Specifications

References

Bibliography

Single-engined tractor aircraft
1920s United States civil utility aircraft
Parasol-wing aircraft
Aircraft first flown in 1927